Roberto Adolfo Goméz (born 5 May 1988) is a Venezuelan swimmer.

References

1988 births
Living people
Swimmers at the 2011 Pan American Games
Pan American Games medalists in swimming
Pan American Games bronze medalists for Venezuela
South American Games bronze medalists for Venezuela
South American Games medalists in swimming
Central American and Caribbean Games gold medalists for Venezuela
Competitors at the 2014 South American Games
Competitors at the 2014 Central American and Caribbean Games
Central American and Caribbean Games medalists in swimming
Medalists at the 2011 Pan American Games
21st-century Venezuelan people